The 2010 Georgia gubernatorial election was held on November 2, 2010. Incumbent Republican Governor Sonny Perdue was term-limited and unable to seek re-election. Primary elections for the Republican and Democratic parties took place on July 20. Democrats nominated former Governor Roy Barnes, and Republicans nominated Representative Nathan Deal following a runoff on August 10. The Libertarian Party also had ballot access and nominated John Monds. Deal won the general election, and took office on January 10, 2011.

, this was the last election in which a candidate won the governorship by double digits. This is the first gubernatorial election in Georgia since 1990 in which the winner was of a different party than the incumbent president. This was the first election in which Republicans won three consecutive gubernatorial elections in the state.

Republican primary

Candidates

Declared
Jeff Chapman, State Senator
Nathan Deal, U.S. Representative
Karen Handel, Secretary of State of Georgia
Eric Johnson, former State Senator
Ray McBerry, candidate for Governor in 2006
John Oxendine, Insurance Commissioner
Otis Putnam

Declined
Johnny Isakson, incumbent U.S. Senator

Polling

Primary

Runoff

Results

Democratic primary

Candidates

Declared
Thurbert Baker, Attorney General of Georgia
Roy Barnes, former Governor of Georgia
Bill Bolton
Carl Camon
Randy Mangham
DuBose Porter, State Representative
David Poythress, former Adjutant General of the Georgia National Guard, former Commissioner of Labor and candidate for Governor in 1998

Polling

Results

Third Party and independent candidates

Independent
Neal Horsley

Libertarian Party
John Monds, president of the Grady County NAACP

Write-in
Samuel M. "Sam" Hay, III
Jacob Perasso (Socialist Workers Party)

General election

Predictions

Polling

Results

See also

2010 United States gubernatorial elections

References

External links
Georgia Secretary of State – Elections Division 
Georgia Governor Candidates at Project Vote Smart
Campaign contributions for 2010 Georgia Governor from Follow the Money
Georgia Governor 2010 from OurCampaigns.com
2010 Georgia Gubernatorial General Election: Nathan Deal (R) vs Roy Barnes (D) graph of multiple polls from Pollster.com
Election 2010: Georgia Governor from Rasmussen Reports
2010 Georgia Governor Race from Real Clear Politics
2010 Georgia Governor's Race from CQ Politics
Race Profile in The New York Times
Debates
Georgia Governor Republican Primary Runoff Debate, C-SPAN, August 8, 2010
Official campaign sites (Archived)
Thurbert Baker
Roy Barnes
Al Bartell
Bill Bolton
Ray Boyd
Carl Camon
Jeff Chapman
Nathan Deal
Karen Handel
Eric Johnson
Randal Mangham
Ray McBerry
John Monds
John Oxendine
DuBose Porter
David Poythress
Otis Putnam

Gubernatorial
2010
Georgia